Twirling Toadstool (previously known as Wave Swinger and Ug Swinger) was a ride at the British theme park Alton Towers. The ride was made up of 48 hanging seats suspended by chains. When the ride began, the chairs were lifted several metres off the ground, then they began to rotate. Once the chairs had been lifted to a certain height, and were rotating fast enough, the chairs were banked as the ride tilted.

The ride did not reopen for the 2017 season and was advertised as being closed for refurbishment. However, this never happened and the ride remained in its location and deteriorated over the next 2 years. As of February 2019, it was removed from Alton Towers website confirming it will not return.

References

Alton Towers
Amusement rides manufactured by Zierer
Amusement rides introduced in 1984
Buildings and structures demolished in 2019